The Florida Department of Children and Families (DCF) is a state agency of Florida. Its headquarters are at 2415 North Monroe St., Ste. 400 in Tallahassee, Florida. The department provides social services in Florida to children, adults, refugees, domestic violence victims, human trafficking victims, the homeless community, child care providers, disabled people, and the elderly.

History
The department was created in 1996 when the Florida Legislature split the former Department of Health and Rehabilitative Services (HRS) into two new departments:  DCF and the Florida Department of Health. The department operates the Florida Adoption Reunion Registry, which is a registry of people who are or were the principal parties in an adoption. The department operates the Florida Civil Commitment Center, in Arcadia, Florida.

Notable cases

Lofton v. Secretary of the Department of Children & Family Services
In Lofton v. Secretary of the Department of Children & Family Services, the department had denied the applications of two gay men to serve as adoptive parents, because the men were homosexuals. The United States Court of Appeals for the Eleventh Circuit upheld Florida's ban of adoption of children by homosexual persons as enforced by the Florida Department of Children and Families.

In re Gill 
Florida's ban on homosexuals adopting children was later challenged in the Florida state courts. In 2006, Frank Martin Gill, an openly gay man, petitioned the department to adopt two boys, but although every assessment and home study showed that the boys were thriving under the excellent care of Gill and his partner, the department denied the petition because it violated the Florida law against adoption by a homosexual.  Eleventh Judicial Circuit Court of Florida Judge Lederman found in favor of Gill, and granted the adoption in  2008.  In In re Gill, Judge Lederman noted: "Here Petitioner qualifies for approval as an adoptive parent in all respects but one: his sexual orientation. The Department's position is that homosexuality is immoral. Yet homosexuals may be lawful foster parents in Florida and care for our most fragile children who have been abused, neglected and abandoned. As such, the exclusion forbidding homosexuals to adopt children does not further the public morality interest it seeks to combat. ... The contradiction between the adoption and foster care statutes defeats the public morality argument and is thus not rationally related to serving a governmental interest." During the Gill trial, the department admitted that "gay people and heterosexuals make equally good parents ... that placing children with gay adoptive parents does not harm or disadvantage children emotionally or physically ... [and] that gay people could be the ideal placements for some children." On appeal, the ban was found unconstitutional under the state Constitution of Florida in 2010 by a Florida state court of appeals, ending Florida's 33-year ban on adoptions by homosexuals.  The state did not appeal the decisions further, thereby ending Florida's ban.

Nikolas Cruz 

Before the 2018 Stoneman Douglas High School shooting in which 19-year-old former student Nikolas Cruz murdered 17 people, and injured 17 others, a Broward County Sheriff's Office deputy had an investigator for the Florida Department of Children and Families speak to Cruz in 2016. However, Cruz's therapist said that he was "not currently a threat to himself or others" and did not need to be committed, a mental health counselor said Cruz did not meet the criteria under Florida law that allows the police to commit a mentally ill person against their will, Stoneman Douglas High School conducted a "threat assessment" on Cruz after the counselor's report, and the Florida Department of Children and Families ultimately concluded that Cruz was not a threat because he was living with his mother, attending school, and seeing a counselor.

Appointed Secretaries

Health and Rehabilitative Services (1969–96)

James A. Bax – 1969–1971
Emmett S. Roberts – 1971–1974
Oliver James Keller Jr. – 1974–1975
Emmett S. Roberts – 1975
William J. Page – 1975-1978
Emmett S. Roberts – 1978-1979
David H. Pingree – 1979-1980
Alvin Taylor – 1980–1981
David H. Pingree – 1981–1987
Gregory L. Coler – 1987–1991
Bob Williams – 1991–1993
Buddy MacKay (acting) – March–July 1993
Jim Towey – 1993–1995
Ed Feaver – 1995–1996

Department of Children and Families (1997–present)

Ed Feaver – 1997–1999 
Kathleen Kearney – 1999–2002
Jerry Regier – 2002–2004
Lucy Hadi – 2004–2006
Bob Butterworth – 2006–2008
George Sheldon – 2008–2011
David Wilkins – 2011–2013
Esther Jacobo (interim) – 2013–2014
Mike Carroll – 2014–2018
Rebecca Kapusta (interim) – 2018-2019
Chad Poppell – 1/15/2019 – 2/19/2021
Shevaun Harris – 2/20/2021 – present

Community-Based Care 
Community-Based Care is an initiative of DCF to improve its Child Welfare and Foster Care Services by contracting with local not-for-profit social services agencies through a competitive procurement process designed to engage community stakeholders. Its goals are to increase accountability, resource development, local community ownership, and system performance.

Lead Agencies

See also 

 Disappearance of Rilya Wilson, a child who was placed in the foster care system of the Florida Department of Children and Families.

References

External links
 

Child abuse in the United States
Child welfare in the United States
State agencies of Florida
1996 establishments in Florida
Government agencies established in 1996